Raidell de Pree (born 17 November 1997) is a Dutch professional basketball player. He played two seasons for Feyenoord Basketball of the Dutch Basketball League (DBL) from 2019 to 2021.

Early life 
De Pree started playing at age 11 and played for the junior teams of CBV Binnenland. In 2015, he moved to the United States to attend St. Mary's Ryken High School in Leonardtown, Maryland.

Career
De Pree played for Kankakee Community College in Kankakee, Illinois, where he graduated in 2018.

In the summer of 2019, De Pree joined Feyenoord after playing his rookie season in Spain with Mataró Parc Boet of the Liga EBA. On August 25, 2020, he extended his contract with one season.

De Pree played for the  U18 and U20 national teams.

References

External links
 Raidell de Pree on Basketballleague.nl
 Raidell de Pree on RealGM

1997 births
Living people
Dutch men's basketball players
Feyenoord Basketball players
Dutch Basketball League players
Sportspeople from Rotterdam
Point guards